Hongzhou is a town in Liping County, Guizhou, China.

Towns in Guizhou
Liping County